Alexandru Ion Vagner (19 August 1989 – 30 September 2022) was a Romanian footballer who played as a midfielder. He spent his entire career playing in Romania, having a total of 120 Liga I appearances with one goal scored and 62 Liga II appearances with two goals scored.

Vagner suffered a heart attack during a training session with Inter Cristian, he was subsequently transported by emergency services to Brașov County Emergency Hospital but nothing could be done to save his life, he died at the age of 33.

References

External links

1989 births
2022 deaths
People from Azuga
Romanian footballers
Association football midfielders
Liga I players
Liga II players
ACF Gloria Bistrița players
CS Minaur Baia Mare (football) players
ASA 2013 Târgu Mureș players
FC Brașov (1936) players
SR Brașov players
CS Concordia Chiajna players
FC Petrolul Ploiești players